Eroakirkosta.fi is a Finnish website which offers an electronic service for resigning from Finland's state churches; the Evangelical Lutheran Church of Finland and the Finnish Orthodox Church. "Eroa kirkosta" translates to "resign from the church".

The website was created by Freethinkers of Tampere, an organisation that supports a formal separation of church and state, and opened on 21 November 2003. The Finnish law on freedom of religion was updated on 1 August 2003 and then allowed resigning from religions without a visit to a bureau. Because eroakirkosta.fi is not maintained by magistrates, the website can not directly resign a person from a church. Instead, the website forwards the filled-in resignation forms to magistrates who then complete the resignation. Resignations through e-mail are allowed because the Finnish law requires resignations to be "in writing" but not "signed". Eroakirkosta.fi also gives the user the alternative to print the resignation form and send it through regular mail.

Eroakirkosta.fi became popular very quickly. Within ten weeks over 1,400 people had resigned through the website. In 2004, almost 39% of all resignations in the country were done through eroakirkosta.fi. In 2005, the percentage increased to 68.9. In 2006, almost four out of five persons resigned through the website. The total resignation rates in Finland have also increased. The number of people resigning from the state churches has tripled in six years (2000–2006), and the 2005 and 2006 resignation numbers both break the old record of 30,710 from 1992. 47 300 members left the church through the service in 2008, that is 91% of all resignations (52,200). In 2011, 46,502 resignations and in 2012, 41,261 resignations were registered at the Eroakirkosta.fi site.

Publicity 
The web service received publicity October 2010, after a gay rights panel discussion on TV on 12 October was followed by thousands of people resigning from the Evangelical Lutheran Church by using the service.

Resignation statistics
From inception through the end of 2017 more than 700 000 Finns out of a total population of 5.5 million resigned using the Eroa Kirkosta website, for the number of resignations by year refer table below.

References

External links
Eroakirkosta.fi
Church Leaving Rising in Finland
Status of the Finnish State Church in 2007
Freethinkers of Tampere
 Slashdot:  Internet Deconstructing State Church in Finland and  Internet Dismantling the State Church in Finland

Finnish websites
Secularism
Religion in Finland
Apostasy
Internet properties established in 2003
Anti-Christian sentiment